François Coulombe-Fortier (born November 15, 1984) is a Canadian taekwondo practitioner. In 2011 Coulombe-Fortier won a bronze medal at the 2011 Pan American Games and later in the year followed up by winning a silver medal at the Pan American Olympic qualification tournament, and by doing so qualified to compete at the 2012 Summer Olympics.  At the 2012 Summer Olympics, he reached the quarter-finals, defeating Gadzhi Umarov in the first round before losing to Daba Modibo Keita in the quarterfinal.

Coulombe-Fortier is also a one time Pan American Championship Champion and has also won numerous medals in world cup events across the globe.

References

1984 births
Canadian male taekwondo practitioners
French Quebecers
Living people
Olympic taekwondo practitioners of Canada
Sportspeople from Quebec City
Taekwondo practitioners at the 2011 Pan American Games
Taekwondo practitioners at the 2012 Summer Olympics
Pan American Games bronze medalists for Canada
Pan American Games medalists in taekwondo
Medalists at the 2011 Pan American Games
21st-century Canadian people